Dalików  is a village in Poddębice County, Łódź Voivodeship, in central Poland. It is the seat of the gmina (administrative district) called Gmina Dalików.

The village has a population of 410.

References

Villages in Poddębice County
Kalisz Governorate
Łódź Voivodeship (1919–1939)